Lakeshore West is one of the seven train lines of the GO Transit system in the Greater Toronto Area, Ontario, Canada. It extends from Union Station in Toronto to Hamilton, with occasional trips extending to St. Catharines and Niagara Falls.

History
The Lakeshore West line is the oldest of GO's services, opening as part of the then-unified Lakeshore line on GO Transit's first day of operations on May 23, 1967. The first train, numbered 946 left at 5:50 am from Oakville bound for Toronto, ten minutes before service began out of Pickering. During the three-year experiment, all day GO Train service ran hourly from Oakville to Pickering with limited rush hour train service to Hamilton. The experiment proved to be extremely popular; GO Transit carried its first million riders during its first four months, and averaged 15,000 per day soon after.

Service began running west from Union, stopping at Mimico, Long Branch, Port Credit, Lorne Park, Clarkson, and Oakville. Rush-hour trains ran to Bronte, Burlington and Hamilton, at the former CN railway station at James Street.

GO trains started serving the Canadian National Exhibition in August 1967 from an older platform just west of the Dufferin Street bridge over the Lakeshore West line and the Queen Elizabeth Way. For the 1968 Exhibition season, temporary booths were set up to handle passengers, which topped 24,000 on the season's busiest day. This prompted the need for a proper station with additional capacity, and by the 1968 Royal Agricultural Winter Fair, the current Exhibition GO Station was built and put in service.

Lorne Park Station closed within the first year of the line's operation. Burlington was re-located approximately 750 metres eastward in March 1980. Appleby GO Station opened on September 19, 1988, followed by Aldershot on May 25, 1992.  The opening of Aldershot coincided with the extension of all day and weekend service from Oakville to Burlington, however, this was reversed due to budget cuts on July 3, 1993.

On April 29, 1996, James Street station was replaced by the Hamilton GO Centre. All day service to Burlington was restored on May 1, 2000, and extended to Aldershot on September 7, 2007. On June 29, 2013, all day service was increased to operate trains every 30 minutes.

A third track was added between Sixteen Mile creek and the Port Credit station. Combined with additional work undertaken since the early 1990s, this gives the Lakeshore West line at least three tracks from Union Station through to Bayview Junction.

In 2009 as a pilot project, GO began operating express trains to St. Catharines and Niagara Falls on weekends and holidays during Niagara Region's busy summer tourist season. The service was provided again during the 2010 season, and was officially made permanently recurring starting in 2011. In 2019, the weekend express service began operating year-round.

West Harbour GO Station opened in July 2015, serving as a second Hamilton terminus for rush-hour train service. In August 2021, all-day service was extended to this station.

On January 7, 2019, one weekday round-trip was extended beyond West Harbour station to Niagara Falls.

Service
On weekdays, local service operates every 15 minutes east of Oakville, every 30 minutes east of Aldershot, and every 60 minutes at West Harbour.

On weekends, local service operates every 30 minutes between Union and Aldershot, and every 60 minutes between Aldershot and West Harbour. Four express trains per day operate between Toronto and Niagara Falls.

All off-peak local trains, as well as some peak trains, are through-routed with the Lakeshore East line to Oshawa.

Four GO bus routes are considered to be part of the Lakeshore West corridor:
 Route 12 provides regular service between Niagara Falls station and Burlington GO Station
 Route 15 connects Aldershot to Brantford, via McMaster University
 Route 16 provides regular express service directly between Hamilton GO Centre and Toronto Union Station
 Route 18 connects Aldershot to Brock University, via Hamilton GO Centre, West Harbour and St. Catharines station.

Future 
As part of the 2008 Metrolinx regional transportation plan entitled The Big Move, the agency identified an express all-day service between Hamilton and Oshawa (via Toronto Union) as one of its top 15 priorities. Metrolinx has also committed to eventually providing service every 15 minutes on the line, as well as electrifying railways. This project, dubbed Regional Express Rail, is expected to reduce some trip times by 20%.

In early 2019, Niagara Falls, New York officials expressed interest in having GO Transit expand rail service over the border to the Niagara Falls station in New York. Metrolinx stated that there are specific restrictions when a train leaves Ontario, or any province in Canada, that require a different set of inspection criteria and standards in order to legally enter the United States which would make a stop at the station difficult.

Niagara Region
Metrolinx is currently planning to expand rail service between Hamilton and Niagara Falls. The project includes two new stations, two upgraded stations, and more than 25 kilometres of new track. Originally planned for completion in 2023, Metrolinx halted the delivery process for the stations in the Niagara extension in November 2018 when the newly-elected 42nd Parliament of Ontario rescinded its funding for their construction. In order to be constructed, the stations would instead be dependent on private financing.

In 2015, Confederation GO Station (in East Hamilton, near Stoney Creek) was announced with a completion date of 2019. As of 2022, the rail station is under construction and is planned to open in 2025.

In June 2016, Ontario Minister of Transportation Steven Del Duca announced that regular service would be extended to Grimsby, with the Grimsby GO Station announced to open in 2021. In 2023, enhanced service was then-expected to begin to the St. Catharines and Niagara Falls Via Rail stations which will be upgraded to support increased GO service.

In March 2022, Metrolinx released an initial business case for a proposed Beamsville GO Station within the Town of Lincoln. It would be located on the west side of Ontario Street in Beamsville along the rail line. Metrolinx expects the proposed station would increase GO Transit ridership by 48,000 trips annually by 2041 including 7,000 to 8,000 tourists annually. The proposed station could possibly include customer parking, a pick-up and drop-off area, bicycle parking, and an area for local and regional public transit buses.

Ownership
In order to facilitate service expansions, GO Transit's parent agency Metrolinx has gradually acquired portions of the Lakeshore West corridor from the freight railway companies Canadian National Railway (CN) and Canadian Pacific Railway (CP). Most of the Lakeshore West line operates along the Oakville subdivision, which was entirely owned by CN prior to 1998.

On March 31, 2010, GO acquired its first segment of the Oakville subdivision, between Union Station and 30th Street in Etobicoke (just west of GO's Willowbrook Rail Maintenance Facility). On March 27, 2012, GO purchased a second segment immediately to the west, extending its ownership to a point just west of Fourth Line in Oakville. On March 22, 2013, Metrolinx purchased a third segment extending its ownership westward to a point just west of Burlington station, where the CN Halton Subdivision joins the line.

In addition to the Union Station Rail Corridor, these three segments represent Metrolinx's current ownership of the line. CN continues to own the tracks between Burlington and the Desjardins Canal, as well as the Grimsby subdivision that carries trains into Niagara Region. CP owns the tracks between the Desjardins Canal and the Hamilton GO Centre.

Station list
Most off-peak trains, as well as some peak trains, continue as part of the Lakeshore East line after stopping at Union Station, with no train change required.

References

General references

Bibliography

External links

 Lakeshore West GO Train and Bus Schedule
Niagara GO Hub and Transit Stations Study at Regional Municipality of Niagara

GO Transit
Passenger rail transport in Toronto
Passenger rail transport in Mississauga
Passenger rail transport in the Regional Municipality of Halton
Passenger rail transport in Hamilton, Ontario
Railway lines opened in 1967
1967 establishments in Ontario